Schwelm West station is a through station in the town of Schwelm in the German state of North Rhine-Westphalia. The station was opened on 29 May 1988 on a section of the Elberfeld–Dortmund railway from Döppersberg, near the current Wuppertal Hauptbahnhof, to Schwelm that was opened by the Bergisch-Märkische Railway Company on 9 October 1847. It has two platform tracks and it is classified by Deutsche Bahn as a category 6 station.

The station is served by Rhine-Ruhr S-Bahn line S 8 between Mönchengladbach and Hagen and line S 9 between Recklinghausen and Hagen, both every 60 minutes.

References

Rhine-Ruhr S-Bahn stations
S8 (Rhine-Ruhr S-Bahn)
S9 (Rhine-Ruhr S-Bahn)
Railway stations in Germany opened in 1988
1988 establishments in West Germany
Ennepe-Ruhr-Kreis